West Union (also called Delta or Union) is an unincorporated community in Reserve Township, Parke County, in the U.S. state of Indiana.

History
West Union was platted in 1837. A post office was established at West Union in 1886, and remained in operation until it was discontinued in 1932.

Geography

References

Unincorporated communities in Indiana
Unincorporated communities in Parke County, Indiana